Cacia formosana is a species of beetle in the family Cerambycidae. It was described by Schwarzer in 1925, originally under the genus Mesosa. It is known from Taiwan.

References

Cacia (beetle)
Beetles described in 1925